"Burnin' Up" is a 1982 song recorded by British post-disco/soul trio Imagination, published by R&B Records in UK and MCA Records in the United States. "Burnin' Up" was composed by Leee John, Ashley Ingram and the Jolley & Swain duo. The song has appeared on their debut album titled Body Talk.

"Burnin' Up" was a club hit in the United States while it failed to chart on the UK Singles Chart.

Track listing
US 12" Promo Single
"Burnin' Up " – 4:50   
"So Good, So Right" – 7:00

Chart positions

References

1982 singles
Imagination (band) songs
Garage house songs
Songs written by Tony Swain (musician)
Songs written by Steve Jolley (songwriter)
1981 songs
MCA Records singles
Songs written by Ashley Ingram
Songs written by Leee John
Song recordings produced by Jolley & Swain